Ccella Ccella (possibly from Quechua q'illa scar, Aymara qhilla scar (in Quechua qhilla or qilla means "lazybones"), the reduplication indicates that there is a group or a complex of something, "a complex of scars") is a mountain in the Chila in the Andes of Peru, about  high. It is situated in the Arequipa Region, Castilla Province, Choco District, and in the Caylloma Province, on the border of the districts of Caylloma and Tapay.

References 

Mountains of Peru
Mountains of Arequipa Region